Stanley Bartlett Smullen Jr. (September 3, 1906 – July 9, 1998) was a Philadelphia businessman who served briefly on the Philadelphia City Council as a Republican.

Smullen was born in 1906 in Point Breeze, Philadelphia, the eldest child of Stanley and Mabel Smullen. The family moved to the city's Mount Airy neighborhood where Smullen's father was worked in real estate. Smullen graduated from the University of Pennsylvania's Wharton School, then joined his father's business. In 1928, he married Charlotte E. Greenwood, with whom he had two children. Smullen also got involved in Republican politics and became the leader of the 59th Ward.

In 1961, the Democratic city councilman for the 8th district, Alfred Leopold Luongo, was appointed to the federal bench, and Republican ward leaders chose Smullen to run in the special election to replace him. He defeated his Democratic opponent, John A. Geisz, to take the seat for the Republicans.

Smullen's term was just over a year, and Republican ward leaders backed him for the nomination to a full term in 1963. In the 1963 election, redistricting added the 49th ward to Smullen's district; the result was a narrow victory for his Democratic opponent, Isadore H. Bellis. In 1964, Smullen ran for the Pennsylvania House of Representatives, but fell short of victory, losing to Democrat Walter H. Morley. He continued to run his real estate business and worked for the state department of commerce, but did not run for office again. He later retired to Ship Bottom, New Jersey, where he died in 1998.

References

Sources

 
 

 

 
 

1906 births
1998 deaths
Businesspeople from Philadelphia
Philadelphia City Council members
Pennsylvania Republicans
Wharton School of the University of Pennsylvania alumni
People from Ship Bottom, New Jersey
20th-century American politicians
20th-century American businesspeople